Santiago Ventura and Rubén Ramírez Hidalgo were the defending champions, but Ramírez Hidalgo chose to not participate this year.
Ventura Bertomeu partnered up by her other compatriot David Marrero and won in the final 6–3, 6–3 over Ilija Bozoljac and Daniele Bracciali.

Seeds

Draw

Draw

References
 Doubles Draw

Open Barletta - Citta della Disfida - Doubles
2010 Doubles